The Aleppo Sanjak was a prefecture (sanjak) of the Ottoman Empire, located in modern-day Syria and Turkey. The city of Aleppo was the Sanjak's capital.

Subdistricts 
 Aleppo Sanjak had many cities: Aleppo, İskenderun, Antakya, Belen, Idlib, Al-Bab and Jisr al-Shughur.

Later history
The territory of Aleppo Sanjak was divided between Turkey and Syria. Antakya and İskenderun (kazas of Halep Sanjak) were part of Syria after the Turkish War of Independence, but they became Hatay State in 1938, and finally joined Turkey in 1939.

References

States and territories established in 1549
1549 establishments in the Ottoman Empire
1918 disestablishments in the Ottoman Empire
Sanjaks of Ottoman Syria
History of Aleppo